Events from the year 1744 in Austria

Incumbents
 Monarch – Maria Theresa

Events

 
 
 August 12 – Battle of Velletri in the Kingdom of Naples: Spanish-Neapolitan forces defeat those of the Archduchy of Austria.

Births

 

  
 January 26 – Ludwig Andreas Graf Khevenhüller, Austrian field marshal (b. 1683)

Deaths

References

 
Years of the 18th century in Austria